Donald Watts Davies,  (7 June 1924 – 28 May 2000) was a Welsh computer scientist who was employed at the UK National Physical Laboratory (NPL). 

In 1965 he conceived of packet switching, which is today the dominant basis for data communications in computer networks worldwide. Davies proposed a commercial national data network in the United Kingdom and designed and built the local-area NPL network to demonstrate the technology. Many of the wide-area packet-switched networks built in the 1970s were similar "in nearly all respects" to his original 1965 design. The ARPANET project credited Davies for his influence, which was key to the development of the Internet.

Davies' work was independent of the work of Paul Baran in the United States who had a similar idea in the early 1960s, and who also provided input to the ARPANET project, after his work was highlighted by Davies' team.

Early life
Davies was born in Treorchy in the Rhondda Valley, Wales. His father, a clerk at a coalmine, died a few months later, and his mother took Donald and his twin sister back to her home town of Portsmouth, where he went to school. He attended the Southern Grammar School for Boys.

He received a BSc degree in physics (1943) at Imperial College London, and then joined the war effort working as an assistant to Klaus Fuchs on the nuclear weapons Tube Alloys project at Birmingham University. He then returned to Imperial taking a first class degree in mathematics (1947); he was also awarded the Lubbock memorial Prize as the outstanding mathematician of his year.

In 1955, he married Diane Burton; they had a daughter and two sons.

Career history

National Physical Laboratory
From 1947, he worked at the National Physical Laboratory (NPL) where Alan Turing was designing the Automatic Computing Engine (ACE) computer. It is said that Davies spotted mistakes in Turing's seminal 1936 paper On Computable Numbers, much to Turing's annoyance. These were perhaps some of the first "programming" bugs in existence, even if they were for a theoretical computer, the universal Turing machine. The ACE project was overambitious and floundered, leading to Turing's departure. Davies took over the project and concentrated on delivering the less ambitious Pilot ACE computer, which first worked in May 1950. A commercial spin-off, DEUCE was manufactured by English Electric Computers and became one of the best-selling machines of the 1950s.

Davies also worked on applications of traffic simulation and machine translation. In the early 1960s, he worked on government technology initiatives designed to stimulate the British computer industry.

Packet switching

In 1965, Davies developed the idea of packet switching, dividing computer messages into packets that are routed independently across a network, possibly via differing routes, and are reassembled at the destination.

Davies used the word "packets" after consulting with a linguist because it was capable of being translated into languages other than English without compromise. Davies' key insight came in the realisation that computer network traffic was inherently "bursty" with periods of silence, compared with relatively constant telephone traffic. He designed and proposed a commercial national data network based on packet switching in his 1966 Proposal for the Development of a National Communications Service for On-line Data Processing.

In 1966 he returned to the NPL at Teddington just outside London, where he headed and transformed its computing activity. He became interested in data communications following a visit to the Massachusetts Institute of Technology, where he saw that a significant problem with the new time-sharing computer systems was the cost of keeping a phone connection open for each user. Davies was the first to describe the concept of an "Interface computer", in 1966, today known as a router. He and his team were one of the first to use the term 'protocol' in a data-commutation context in 1967. The NPL team also carried out simulation work on packet networks, including datagram networks.

His work on packet switching, presented by his colleague Roger Scantlebury, initially caught the attention of the developers of ARPANET, a US defence network, at the Symposium on Operating Systems Principles in October 1967. In Scantlebury's report following the conference, he noted "It would appear that the ideas in the NPL paper at the moment are more advanced than any proposed in the USA". Larry Roberts of the Advanced Research Projects Agency in the United States applied Davies' concepts of packet switching in the late 1960s for the ARPANET, which went on to become a predecessor to the Internet. These early years of computer resource sharing were documented in the 1972 film Computer Networks: The Heralds of Resource Sharing.

Davies first presented his own ideas on packet switching at a conference in Edinburgh on 5 August 1968. At NPL Davies directed the development of a local-area packet-switched network, the Mark I NPL network. It was replaced with the Mark II in 1973, and remained in operation until 1986, influencing other research in the UK and Europe, including Louis Pouzin's CYCLADES project in France.

Unbeknown to him, Paul Baran of the RAND Corporation in the United States was also working on a similar concept; when Baran became aware of Davies's work he acknowledged that they both had equally discovered the concept. Baran was happy to acknowledge that Davies had come up with the same idea as him independently. In an e-mail to Davies, he wrote 

Leonard Kleinrock, a contemporary working on analysing message flow using queueing theory, developed a theoretical basis for the operation of message switching networks in his PhD thesis during 1961-2, published as a book in 1964. However, Kleinrock's later claim to have developed the theoretical basis of packet switching networks is disputed by other Internet pioneers, including by Robert Taylor, Baran and Davies. Davies and Baran are recognized by historians and the U.S. National Inventors Hall of Fame for independently inventing the concept of digital packet switching used in modern computer networking including the Internet.

Internetworking 
Davies, along with his deputy Derek Barber and Roger Scantlebury, conducted research into protocols for internetworking. They participated in the International Networking Working Group from 1972, initially chaired by Vint Cerf and later Derek Barber. Davies and Scantlebury were acknowledged by Bob Kahn and Vint Cerf in their 1974 paper on internetworking, "A Protocol for Packet Network Intercommunication".

Davies and Barber published "Communication networks for computers" in 1973. They spoke at the Data Communications Symposium in 1975 about the "battle for access standards" between datagrams and virtual circuits, with Barber saying the "lack of standard access interfaces for emerging public packet-switched communication networks is creating 'some kind of monster' for users". For a long period of time, the network engineering community was polarized over the implementation of competing protocol suites, a debate commonly called the 'Protocol Wars'. It was unclear which type of protocol would result in the best and most robust computer networks. Internetworking experiments at NPL under Davies included connecting with the European Informatics Network by translating between two different host protocols and connecting with the Post Office Experimental Packet Switched Service using a common host protocol in both networks. Their research confirmed establishing a common host protocol would be more reliable and efficient than translating between different host protocols using a gateway. Davies and Barber published "Computer networks and their protocols" in 1979.

Computer network security
Davies relinquished his management responsibilities in 1979 to return to research. He became particularly interested in computer network security. Together with David O. Clayden, he designed the Message Authenticator Algorithm (MAA) in 1983, one of the first message authentication code algorithms to gain widespread acceptance. It was adopted as international standard ISO 8731-2 in 1987. 

He retired from NPL in 1984, becoming a leading consultant on data security to the banking industry and publishing a book on the topic that year.

Later career 
In 1987, Davies became a visiting professor at Royal Holloway and Bedford New College.

Awards and honours
Davies was appointed a Distinguished Fellow of the British Computer Society (BCS) in 1975 and was made a CBE in 1983, and later a Fellow of the Royal Society in 1987. 

He received the John Player Award from the BCS in 1974. and was awarded a medal by the John von Neumann Computer Society in Hungary in 1985.

In 2000, Davies shared the inaugural IEEE Internet Award. In 2007, he was inducted into the National Inventors Hall of Fame, and in 2012 Davies was inducted into the Internet Hall of Fame by the Internet Society.

NPL sponsors a gallery, opened in 2009, about the development of packet switching and "Technology of the Internet" at The National Museum of Computing. 

A blue plaque commemorating Davies was unveiled in Treorchy in July 2013.

Family 
Davies was survived by his wife Diane, a daughter and two sons.

See also 
History of the Internet
Internet in the United Kingdom § History
 Internet pioneers

Books
 
 
  with W. Price, D. Barber, C. Solomonides

References

External links

Oral history interview with Donald W. Davies, Charles Babbage Institute, University of Minnesota.  Davies describes computer projects at the UK National Physical Laboratory, from the 1947 design work of Alan Turing to the development of the two ACE computers.  Davies discusses a much larger, second ACE, and the decision to contract with English Electric Company to build the DEUCE—one of the first commercially produced computers in Great Britain.
Biography from the History of Computing Project
Donald Davies profile page at NPL
A Tribute to Donald Davies (1924–2000)
UK National Physical Laboratory (NPL) & Donald Davies from Living Internet
Computer Networks: The Heralds of Resource Sharing, documentary ca. 1972 about the ARPANET. Includes footage of Donald W. Davies (at 19m20s).

1924 births
2000 deaths
Alumni of Imperial College London
Commanders of the Order of the British Empire
Fellows of the British Computer Society
Fellows of the Royal Society
History of computing in the United Kingdom
Internet pioneers
Packets (information technology)
People from Treorchy
Recreational cryptographers
Scientists of the National Physical Laboratory (United Kingdom)
Welsh computer scientists
Welsh inventors